The Malaysia Fed Cup team represents Malaysia in Fed Cup tennis competition and are governed by the Lawn Tennis Association of Malaysia. They did not compete during 2003 to 2012. In 2013 they made their return to Fed Cup finishing 6th in the Asia/Oceania Zone Group II.

History
Malaysia competed in its first Fed Cup in 1989.  Their best result was finishing seventh in Group I Asia/Oceania zone in 1996.

Current team
Aslina Chua An Ping
Theiviya Selvarajoo
Alyssa Boey
Nurin Nabilah Roslan

See also
Fed Cup
Malaysia Davis Cup team

External links

Billie Jean King Cup teams
Fed Cup
Fed Cup